Ross Colton (born September 11, 1996) is an American professional ice hockey center currently playing for the Tampa Bay Lightning of the National Hockey League (NHL). 

Growing up in New Jersey, Colton played at Princeton Day School for two seasons before transferring to Taft School, a boarding school in Connecticut, for his junior year. Following his junior year at Taft, Colton was drafted by the Cedar Rapids RoughRiders of the United States Hockey League. He spent another two years with the team, setting a league record for most goals and points at a USHL/NHL Top Prospects Game. As a result, Colton was selected by the Tampa Bay Lightning in the fourth round, 118th overall, of the 2016 NHL Entry Draft. 

Following the NHL draft, Colton played two seasons with the Vermont Catamounts men's ice hockey team before signing a two-year entry-level contract with the Lightning. In his second season with the organization, Colton won the Stanley Cup by scoring the Stanley Cup-clinching goal in Game 5.

Early life
Colton was born on September 11, 1996, in Robbinsville Township, New Jersey, United States. Colton was born into an athletic family; his father Rob was a baseball and soccer player at Steinert High School while his mother played basketball at McCorristin. Growing up, Colton was a fan of the New Jersey Devils and considered Zach Parise as his favorite player. Colton attended Sharon Elementary School in Robbinsville and Pond Road Middle School.

Playing career
Growing up in New Jersey, Colton began his ice hockey career with the Mercer Chiefs under head coach Chris Barcless. During the 2012–13 season, Colton played with the New Jersey Rockets of the in the Atlantic Youth Hockey League where he recorded 22 goals and 41 points in 23 games. After being cut from a couple of local hockey Festival teams, Colton started training with Kevin Wagner and Barcless before joining Princeton Day School alongside his older brother Robert. During his time at Princeton, Colton played both hockey and baseball before transferring to Taft School, a boarding school in Connecticut, for his junior year. 

Following his junior year at Taft, Colton was drafted in the 11th round, 179th overall, by the Cedar Rapids RoughRiders of the United States Hockey League (USHL). During his time with the team, he attended and graduated from Washington High School in Iowa. During his second season with the RoughRiders, Colton set a league record for most goals and points at a USHL/NHL Top Prospects Game and was subsequently named Team East's Most Valuable Player. He was also selected for Team USA's World Junior A Challenge Select Team where he scored five points to earn a bronze medal. Prior to the 2016 NHL Entry Draft, Colton ranked second in the league in points and goals with 35 goals and 66 points. As a result, he was drafted in the fourth round, 118th overall, by the Tampa Bay Lightning.

Collegiate
Colton played for the Vermont Catamounts men's ice hockey (UVM) team for two seasons before turning professional. During his freshman season, Colton skated in 33 games and recorded a team-high 12 goals and 15 assists. Despite missing four of the final five games of the season due to an injury, he tied for the team-lead in goals and second in points. As a result of his offensive output, Colton was named to the Pro Ambitions Hockey East All-Rookie Team.

Colton returned to the Catamounts for his sophomore season, where he skated in nearly all 37 games and posted career-highs in goals, power-play goals, and points. He recorded his first collegiate hat trick on October 7, 2017, in a 4–3 loss to Colorado College, becoming the first UVM player to do so since Jon Turk on October 11, 2014. As a result of his offensive output, Colton earned a Hockey East All-Star Honorable Mention.

During the 2018 offseason, Colton initially turned down a professional contract in order to return to the Catamounts for his junior season. However, he later concluded his collegiate career on June 26, 2018, by signing a two-year entry-level contract with the Lightning. He finished his tenure at Vermont with 28 goals and 50 points through 69 total games.

Professional
Upon concluding his collegiate career, Colton attended the Lightning's 2018 training camp before being assigned to their American Hockey League affiliate, the Syracuse Crunch for the 2018–19 season.  He recorded his first professional career goal during a 6–3 loss to the Charlotte Checkers on October 27, 2018. As the season continued, Colton maintained a scoring streak of seven points within five games including his first career multi-goal game. He finished his rookie season ranked third on the team for goals with 14 and was fourth overall with 31 points. 

Following his rookie season, Colton was invited to participate in the Lightning's training camp but was again returned to the Crunch for the 2019–20 season. Once the league returned to play in January, Colton was re-called to the NHL level after playing in three AHL games. On February 24, 2021, Colton skated in his first career NHL game in a 3–0 Lightning win over the visiting Carolina Hurricanes at Amalie Arena. During the game, he recorded his first career NHL goal and point, becoming the ninth player in Lightning history to score a goal in their NHL debut. Colton also joined Nikita Kucherov as the only players in team history to record a game-winning goal in their first game. He remained with the team as they pushed to qualify for the 2021 Stanley Cup playoffs, while also recording nine goals and 12 points in 30 regular-season games.

As the Lightning qualified for the Stanley Cup playoffs, Colton made his postseason debut playing on their third and fourth line. He recorded his first post-season goal during Game 3 in an overtime loss to the Florida Panthers. Following this, he became a replacement for Barclay Goodrow on the Lightning's third line and scored the teams' sole goal in a 4–1 loss during Game 5. The Lightning eventually eliminated the Panthers from playoff contention and advanced to the Stanley Cup Second Round against the Hurricanes. While playing alongside Patrick Maroon and Tyler Johnson, he helped the team advance to the Stanley Cup semifinals by scoring a goal in a 2–0 win over the Hurricanes.

On July 7, 2021, Colton scored the first goal of Game 5 that ended up being the winning goal of the 2021 Stanley Cup Finals, giving Tampa Bay their third Stanley Cup win in franchise history.

As a restricted free agent leading into the 2021–22 NHL season, Colton and the Lightning agreed to a two-year, $2.25-million contract extension on August 9, 2021.

Career statistics

Awards and honors

References

External links

1996 births
American men's ice hockey centers
Cedar Rapids RoughRiders players
Ice hockey players from New Jersey
Living people
People from Robbinsville Township, New Jersey
Princeton Day School alumni
Sportspeople from Mercer County, New Jersey
Stanley Cup champions
Syracuse Crunch players
Tampa Bay Lightning draft picks
Tampa Bay Lightning players
Vermont Catamounts men's ice hockey players